Events in the year 1633 in Norway.

Incumbents
Monarch: Christian IV

Events

Arts and literature

Births
 Didrik Muus, priest, painter, copper engraver (died 1706).

Deaths

See also

References